

Events

July events 

 July 6 – The Kilmarnock and Troon Railway becomes the first public railway line to open in Scotland. It begins life as a 9.5-mile (16-kilometre), double track  gauge, horse-drawn waggonway to carry coal from Kilmarnock to Troon harbour; the engineer was William Jessop. On 27 June the horse-drawn passenger coach Caledonia began running over the line between Troon and Gargieston, near Kilmarnock.

August events 

 August 12 – The Middleton Railway, serving coal pits at Leeds in England, becomes the first to use steam locomotives successfully in regular service. The first locomotive, Salamanca, is also the first to use two cylinders and has a rack railway mechanism devised by John Blenkinsop and built by Matthew Murray.

Births

March births 
 March 20 – Charles Vincent Walker, English railway telegraph engineer (d. 1882).

May births 
 May 10 – William Henry Barlow, English railway civil engineer (d. 1902).

August births 
 August 15 – William Kimmel, director for Baltimore and Ohio Railroad (d. 1886).

December births 
 December 12 – James Grant, first president of Chicago, Rock Island and Pacific Railroad, 1851–1854 (d. 1891).
 December 23 – Samuel Smiles, British engineering biographer and railway manager (d. 1904).

Unknown date births
 William F. Harnden, the first person to send an express shipment by rail (d. 1845).

Deaths

References
 Rivanna Chapter, National Railway Historical Society (2005), This Month in Railroad History: March. Retrieved March 30, 2005.